Ptilocaulis  is a genus of demosponges. The species within this genus are usually red or orange. They are often called tree sponges, as they grow many branches from a single stem resembling trees. They can grow to large size.

Species
The following species are included in the genus Ptilocaulis:
 Ptilocaulis aulopora (Schmidt, 1870)
 Ptilocaulis bistyla (Hechtel, 1983)
 Ptilocaulis braziliensis (Hechtel, 1983)
 Ptilocaulis digitatus Topsent, 1928
 Ptilocaulis echidnaeus (Lamarck, 1814)
 Ptilocaulis fosteri (Hechtel, 1983)
 Ptilocaulis marquezii (Duchassaing & Michelotti, 1864)
 Ptilocaulis spiculifer (Lamarck, 1814)
 Ptilocaulis walpersii (Duchassaing & Michelotti, 1864)

References

Axinellidae
Taxa named by Henry John Carter
Sponge genera